Disney Resort is a station on Line 11 of the Shanghai Metro in Shanghai's Pudong New Area. Located within the Shanghai Disney Resort complex, it serves as the eastern terminus of Line 11 and also a transportation hub for travel to and within the resort area. The station opened on April 26, 2016, and is known for its design, including a blue color scheme, fantasy elements, and skylight roof, and is fully accessible.

History 
The station opened for "soft" passenger trial operation on April 26, 2016, two months prior to the opening of the Shanghai Disney Resort. During the trial period, due to the continuing construction around the metro station, passengers were suggested to avoid using the station. The station was ready for full passenger operation with the opening of the resort complex on June 16, 2016.

Description 
The station is located within the Shanghai Disney Resort complex, just east of the gates to Shanghai Disneyland Park and north of Wishing Star Park and overlooking the Wishing Star Lake. On the north side of the station is a bus terminal which provides bus services to areas throughout the park.

The station structure itself is semi-underground, with the concourse located at street level and the platform one level below. Located at concourse level are ticket machines, fare gates, and customer service counters. There are four entrances to the station. Toilets are available on the platform level, at the west end, within the fare-paid zone. Like all stations on Line 11, Disney Resort Station is fully accessible. There are two elevators which connect the concourse level to the platform.

For the extension to this station, three of Line 11's 60 trains have been decorated with Disney elements, similar to the Hong Kong Disneyland Resort line. However, unlike its Hong Kong counterpart, the line's Disney livery is not as extensive, since the line is primarily a commuter metro line that serves other suburban districts of Shanghai, as opposed to a dedicated line servicing mostly resort guests. The station itself incorporates a blue color scheme that highlights fantasy elements, which was selected by a public poll. A skylight ceiling above the concourse level brings natural light indoors.

Service 
Service is provided daily at this station from 06:00 to 22:30. At all other times, both North Jiading and -bound trains begin their trips at the station.

Exits 
There are four exits of the station:
 Exit 1: Disneyland, west side
 Exit 2: Wishing Star Park, south side
 Exit 3: East Shendi Road, east side
 Exit 4: Bus terminal, north side

See also

Rail transport in Walt Disney Parks and Resorts

References

Line 11, Shanghai Metro
Shanghai Disney Resort
Shanghai Metro stations in Pudong
Rail transport in Walt Disney Parks and Resorts
Railway stations in Shanghai
Railways of amusement parks in China
Railway stations in China opened in 2016